The Merchants' War is a 1984 satirical science fiction novel by American writer Frederik Pohl. Set in a near future commercial dystopian interplanetary society, the novel was a sequel to The Space Merchants, and was originally co-published with it as Venus, Inc. Pohl's collaborator in the first novel, C.M. Kornbluth, died in 1958, and so did not contribute to this sequel.

In the story, the colony on Venus has managed to stabilize itself to a point. However, agents from the trans-national corporations on Earth attempt to undermine the stability of the colony. The story follows the trail of two advertisement company employees from the colony back to Earth, as one of them, Tennison Tarb, struggles with addiction and its effect on his advertising career. Eventually, he uncovers a 'Veenie' plot to take over Earth and has to choose sides. As with the preceding book, the characters are not what they seem, and the main character's loyalty changes drastically.

Reception
Dave Langford reviewed The Merchants' War for White Dwarf #70, and stated that "The original 'comic inferno' ended with the hero's escape to Venus: the hero of The Merchant's War stays on Earth and reforms it, with a priggishness which wrecks the satire. It's easy reading, but a completely unnecessary book."

Reviews
Review by Richard D. Erlich (1985) in Fantasy Review, March 1985
Review [French] by Michel Cossement (1985) in SFère, #21
Review by Tom A. Jones (1985) in Vector 128
Review [French] by Richard D. Nolane (1985) in Fiction, #367
Review by Kenny Mathieson (1985) in Foundation, #35 Winter 1985/1986, (1986)
Review by Ken Lake (1987) in Paperback Inferno, #65
Review [Serbian] by Miodrag Milovanović? (1987) in Alef, #1
Review [French] by Bertrand Bonnet (2008) in Bifrost, #52

References

1984 American novels
1984 science fiction novels
American science fiction novels
Novels by Frederik Pohl
Sequel novels
Dystopian novels
Novels set on Venus
Novels about advertising